91 Oginome Collection is a compilation album by Japanese singer Yōko Oginome. Released through Victor Entertainment on December 16, 1990, the album compiles Oginome's singles from 1985 to 1990, plus the new songs "Rock My Love", "This Girl", and "More More Shiawase".

The album peaked at No. 29 on Oricon's albums chart and sold over 56,000 copies.

Track listing

Charts

References

External links
 

1990 compilation albums
Yōko Oginome compilation albums
Japanese-language compilation albums
Victor Entertainment compilation albums